Oshima Shipbuilding Co., Ltd. is a privately held Japanese shipbuilding company.  The company was founded on February 7, 1973, and began operations in June 1974.  It is a joint venture between Sumitomo Corporation, Sumitomo Heavy Industries, and the Daizo Corporation.

Overviews 
The company's main offices and shipyard are located in Oshima, on Oshima island, Saikai  City, Nagasaki Prefecture, close to the entrance to Sasebo bay. Because of the shipyard presence, Oshima is nicknamed "the town of shipbuilding', although the island has many natural features.

History
Oshima launched its first ship in 1975.  The disruptions in the oil industry of the 1970s caused the company difficulties.  Between 1975 and 1979 Oshima reduced its workforce from 1,800 to 785.  In response, the company repositioned itself to specialize in building handymax and panamax bulk carriers.

The company has built 400 bulk carriers and delivers about 25 new ships annually to a worldwide client base. As of March 2018, the company has annual revenues of 116,000,000,000 Yen and a staff of 1344 full-time employees.  An additional 660 workers work for Oshima on a subcontracting basis.

Products

The company specializes in building bulk carriers. Some of the handymax-sized vessels have optional open and semi-open hatch configurations.

The company provides three hull options: single-hull, double-hull, and its own proprietary "Hy-Con" or hybrid hull configuration. Single hulls are available on the smallest and largest of the vessels.

The Hy-Con design was developed to increase safety and the efficiency of cargo handling on bulkers.  This design starts as a standard single-hulled ship.  Then, the forward and aft holds are built up to double-hull structures.

Oshima has built a number of other types of ships.  The list includes self-unloading bulkers, wood-chip carriers, car carriers, oil tankers, and submersible heavy-lift vessels.  The company has also built other large structures, including the Oshima Bridge and the Fukuoka Dome.

Notes

References

External links
Vessels Built list at Det Norske Veritas
Shipyard at WikiMapia
Risk Assessment of Double-Skin Bulk Carriers analyzes the Hy-Con design

Shipbuilding companies of Japan
Sumitomo Heavy Industries